Rubus moluccanus, the Molucca bramble or broad-leaf bramble, is a scrambling shrub or climber, native to moist eucalyptus forest and rainforest of eastern Australia, distributed from Queensland to Victoria and North-East Indian states of Assam, Meghalaya, Nagaland and Arunachal Pradesh. Molucca bramble leaves are simple with 3-5 lobes, 2–15 cm long, and 3–10 cm wide, and the lower surface tomentose. Flowers pinkish red or white. Red fruit is 1.2 cm wide.

Uses
Regarded as a tasty edible fruit. Eaten out-of-hand, and used commercially to a limited extent in jams and sauces. It is used as traditional health care practices and highly enriched with vitamin C.

References

External links
 
 
 

moluccanus
Bushfood
Plants described in 1753
Taxa named by Carl Linnaeus